Tyler is an unincorporated community in Dallas County, Alabama. Tyler, Alabama was featured in Verse 34 of the Whitman, Alabama project.

References

Unincorporated communities in Alabama
Unincorporated communities in Dallas County, Alabama